is a national highway connecting Takeo and Sasebo in Japan.

Route data
Length: 35.2 km (21.9 mi)
Origin: Takeo, Saga (originates at junction with Route 34)
Terminus: Sasebo, Nagasaki (ends at the terminal of Route 204)
Major cities: Arita

History
4 December 1952: First Class National Highway 35 (from Takeo to Sasebo)
1 April 1965: General National Highway 35 (from Takeo to Sasebo)

Overlapping sections
From Nishiarita (Imari-guchi intersection) to Sasebo (Tagonoura intersection): Route 202
In Sasebo, from Tagonoura intersection to the terminus: Route 206

Municipalities passed through
Saga Prefecture
Takeo - Arita
Nagasaki Prefecture
Sasebo

Intersects with

Saga Prefecture
Route 34; at the origin, in Takeo
Route 202; from Arita to Sasebo
Nagasaki Prefecture
Routes 205, 206 and 384 ; at Sasebo City
Route 204; at the terminus

References

035
Roads in Nagasaki Prefecture
Roads in Saga Prefecture